John Campbell Greenway is a 1930 bronze statue of John Campbell Greenway by Gutzon Borglum, one version of which was installed in the United States Capitol, in Washington D.C., as part of the National Statuary Hall Collection.  It was one of two statues donated by the state of Arizona.   The sculpture was unveiled by Senator Henry Ashurst of Arizona on May 24, 1930.

National Statuary Hall Collection and Phoenix
The Greenway statue was replaced in the Statuary Hall Collection by a statue of Barry Goldwater by Deborah Copenhaver Fellows in 2015.  The Greenway statue was relocated in the Polly Rosenbaum Archives and History Building in Phoenix, where it presides over the entrance lobby in a niche designed for the work. On the wall behind the statue is a large photograph of Borglum working on the almost completed statue.

Tucson

A second casting of the statue, located in front of the Arizona Historical Society building in Tucson, Arizona, was dedicated on April 11, 1975.

See also
 1930 in art

References

External links
 

1930 establishments in Washington, D.C.
1930 sculptures
Bronze sculptures in Washington, D.C.
Greenway
Monuments and memorials in Arizona
Monuments and memorials in Washington, D.C.
Sculptures by Gutzon Borglum
Sculptures of men in Arizona
Sculptures of men in Washington, D.C.
Statues in Arizona